Donkey Rhubarb is a 1995 EP by electronic music artist Richard D. James under the alias of Aphex Twin. The EP was released on 14 August 1995 by Warp. The EP contains a version of the song "Icct Hedral" from James' album ...I Care Because You Do by Philip Glass.

Release
Donkey Rhubarb was released on 14 August 1995 by Warp on 12" vinyl and compact disc. Donkey Rhubarb charted for one week in the United Kingdom at number 78 on the UK Singles Chart. A music video for "Donkey Rhubarb" directed by David Slade was made in 1995. The video was released on DVD by Warp in September 2009.

Reception

Spin referred to the track "Donkey Rhubarb" as a "silly steeldrum reverie". Ned Raggett of AllMusic gave the EP a four star rating, praising "Donkey Rhubarb" for its "lovely main melody dressed up with quick beats, bleeps, and the like" and stating about Philip Glass' version of "Icct Hedral" that "the original's chilly melody made even more serenely beautiful and disturbing all at once thanks to Glass' fine orchestration".

Track listing

Credits
Credits adapted from Donkey Rhubarb disc.
 Richard D. James – producer (on tracks 1, 2 and 4), writer
 Philip Glass – writer (on track 3)
 Kurt Munkasci – producer (on track 3)
 Michael Reisman – producer (on track 3)
 Anne Pope – recording and mix engineer (on track 3)
 Rich Costey – additional engineer (on track 3)

See also
 1995 in music
 Music of the United Kingdom (1990s)

References

1995 EPs
Aphex Twin EPs
Music videos directed by David Slade